Bruce Michael Bagley (born 1945/1946) is an American academic, and chair of department and professor of international studies at the  University of Miami. 

In November 2019, he was charged with money laundering, and in June 2020 he pled guilty to laundering approximately $2.5 million in deposits from overseas accounts that were controlled by Alex Saab and keeping a percentage for himself. On Nov. 17, 2021, he was sentenced to  six months in prison.

Biography 
Bagley is the co-author of Drug Trafficking, Organized Crime and Violence in the Americas Today, published in 2015.

Bagley has done consultancy work for the United Nations Development Program (UNDP), for the U.S. Government, including the Department of State, Department of Defense, Department of Justice, the Federal Bureau of Investigation, and the Drug Enforcement Administration, and for governments of Colombia, Ecuador, Bolivia, Panama, and Mexico on issues related to drug trafficking, money laundering, and public security.

Bagley has testified before the U.S. Congress on matters related to Latin America on numerous occasions, and has also appeared in U.S. federal court as an expert witness on drug trafficking and organized crime in Latin America.

In November 2019, Bagley was charged with laundering about US$2.5 million in deposits from overseas accounts that were controlled by Alex Saab. He was placed on administrative leave by the University of Miami.  

In June 2020, he pleaded guilty. In a November 2021 court filing Bagley's attorney's claimed that an intermediary, later identified by Bagley as Jorge Luis Hernandez, told Bagley the $2.5 million he received from Saab was to pay lawyers who were assisting Saab, who had provided information on the Maduro government to U.S. authorities, with his cooperation with U.S. government. Saab denied meeting with U.S. authorities.

Bagley lives in Coral Gables, Florida.

Publications
Drug Trafficking and Organized Crime in the Americas: Major Trends in the Twenty-First Century, Latin American Program, Woodrow Wilson Center, 2012
International Relations in Latin America, with Betty Horwitz, Taylor & Francis, 2013
Drug Trafficking, Organized Crime and Violence in the Americas Today, with Jonathan Rosen, University Press of Florida, 2015

References

Living people
University of Miami faculty
1940s births